Interrante is a surname. Notable people with the surname include:
, Italian television personality
Scott Interrante (born 1961), American stage magician
Victoria Interrante, American computer scientist